Dan Makham Tia is a district (amphoe) in the southern part of Kanchanaburi province, central Thailand.

History
The area of Dan Makham Tia was settled more than 200 years. It was a border village of Mueang Kanchanaburi adjacent to Burma.

The area had a short Makham tree (Tamarindus indica), so people called the village Ban Nong Makham Tia. Later was changed to be Dan Makham Tia.

The minor district (king amphoe) was created on 1 April 1990 by splitting off the three tambons Dan Makham Tia, Klondo, and Chorakhe Phueak from Mueang Kanchanaburi district. It was upgraded to a full district on 8 September 1995.

Geography
Neighboring districts are (from the north clockwise) Mueang Kanchanaburi, Tha Muang of Kanchanaburi Province, Chom Bueng and Suan Phueng of Ratchaburi province.

The most important water resources in the area are the Khwae Noi and Phachi River.

Administration
The district is divided into four sub-districts (tambons), which are further subdivided into 39 villages (mubans'). Dan Makham Tia is a township (thesaban tambon) which covers parts of tambon'' Dan Makham Tia. There are a further four tambon administrative organizations (TAO).

References

External links
amphoe.com

Dan Makham Tia